In music, the Romanian Minor scale or Ukrainian Dorian scale or altered Dorian scale is a musical scale or the fourth mode of the harmonic minor scale.
It is "similar to the dorian mode, but with a tritone and variable sixth and seventh degrees". It is related to both the Freygish and Misheberak scales and is used in Jewish music, "predominant in klezmer bulgarish and doina (doyne)." "When the Ukrainian Dorian scale functions in the synagogue, it is a mode known as the Mi sheberach (May He Who Blessed) or Av horachamon (Compassionate Father). Arab and Greek scholars give other names to the scale: Nikriz (نكريز) and Aulos, respectively."

"The pitches of the Mi Shebeyrekh [cantorial] mode correspond roughly to a Dorian mode with a raised fourth (for example, D, E, F, G, A, B, C, or if Katythian Enharmonic mode of Harmonic Minor 4:D, E, F, G, A, B, C); alternately, it could be described as a variant of the Lydian mode, deriving instead from the harmonic minor scale, rather than from the major scale. Beregovski calls this pitch collection 'Ukrainian Dorian'."

The Ukrainian Dorian scale is used particularly extensively within Julian Cochran's music including the Romanian Dances and Mazurkas. It has also been used by George Gershwin. Another example is the Bert Kaempfert tune "Sweet Maria".

Also called the Ukrainian minor scale, it is a combined type of musical scale. It figures prominently in Eastern European music, particularly Klezmer music, and melodies based on this scale have an exotic, romantic flavor for listeners accustomed to more typical Western scales.

A Ukrainian minor scale in the key of C would proceed as follows: C D E F G A B.
A Ukrainian minor scale in the key of B would proceed as follows:  B C D E F G A.
Its step pattern is w - h - + - h - w - h - w, where w indicates a whole step, h indicates a half step, and + indicates an augmented second, which looks like a minor third on a keyboard but is notationally distinct.

Chords that may be derived from the scale based on B are Bm, C#7, D, E#dim7, F#m, G#m7b5 and Aaug.
This scale is obtainable from the harmonic minor scale by starting from the fourth of that scale. Said another way, the B Ukrainian minor scale is the fourth mode of the F# harmonic minor scale. When its tonic is lowered a semitone, we obtain the Katythian Enharmonic scale, the 4th mode of the Harmonic Minor 4 scale:B C D E F G A/C D E F G A B/C D E F G A B. Chords that may be derived from the Katythian Enharmonic scale based on B are Bbaug, C#6, D, Bb7, F#m, F#, Bbm, G#7sus2b5 and Aaug. Likewise, Chords that may be derived from the Katythian Enharmonic scale based on C are Cbaug, D6, Eb, Cb7, Gm, G, Cbm, A7sus2b5, and Bbaug, and for the one based on C:Caug, D#6, E, C7, G#m, G#, Cm, A#7sus2b5, and Baug.

Use in Jewish and Roman music

In Jewish and Roman music the altered Dorian scale may be called the Misheberak scale. It may also be called Av horachamin (Compassionate Father), Mi Shebeyrekh, and Misheberach. This scale was used extensively by Erik Satie, especially noticeable in his Gnossienne No 3.

See also
Minor gypsy scale
Hungarian minor scale
Phrygian dominant scale
Double harmonic scale
Melodic minor scale

Hemavati, the Indian Carnatic music corresponding to Ukrainian Dorian scale.

References

Further reading
Hewitt, Michael. Musical Scales of the World. The Note Tree. 2013. .

External links
 The Ukrainian Dorian Scale mapped out for guitar in all positions
 Ukrainian Dorian Scale - Analysis

Heptatonic scales
Hemitonic scales
Tritonic scales
Musical scales with augmented seconds